is a railway station in Tosu, Saga Prefecture, Japan. It is the junction between the Kagoshima Main Line and the Nagasaki Main Line.

Lines

In addition, the station is the starting point of the Nagasaki Main Line.

Besides the local trains of these lines, trains of the following limited express services also stop at the station:
 Huis Ten Bosch
 Relay Kamome
 Midori
 Yufu/Yufu DX/Yufuinnomori

Station layout
The station consists of three island platforms serving six tracks at grade. Passing loops run between the island platforms and several more passing loops are located to the east, beyond platform 6. Access to the island platforms is by two underground passageways connecting them with the station building. One of the underpasses is served by elevators. A footbridge known as the Rainbow Bridge spans the station plazas to the east and the west of the tracks and is also served by elevators. The station building, is located on the west side of the tracks and houses shops, a waiting area a JR Kyushu ticket window (with Midori no Madoguchi facility) and a JR travel centre. Several udon/soba stands are located in the station, including one on each of the island platforms. A JGR Class 230 steam locomotive (No.268) is on display on the east side of the station.

Platforms

Adjacent stations

History 
When the Kyushu Railway was nationalized on 1 July 1907, Japanese Government Railways (JGR) took over control of the station. On 12 October 1909, the station became part of the Hitoyoshi and Nagasaki Main Lines. On 21 November 1909, the Hitoyoshi Main Line was renamed the Kagoshima Main Line. With the privatization of Japanese National Railways (JNR), the successor of JGR, on 1 April 1987, JR Kyushu took over control of the station.

The present station building was built in 1903. An extension in 1911 left the original Meiji era building structure intact. It is one of the oldest existing railway station buildings in Kyushu. Despite its historical value, the Saga City authorities decided, in May 2017, to build a new station building slightly to the south of the existing one. The new building will be a hashigami structure in which the station facilities would be located on a bridge spanning the tracks. The project would take about ten years to complete. The city authorities explained that a new building was necessary due to the limited space available in the present building but that it would consider measures to preserve and repurpose the historic structure.

Passenger statistics
In fiscal 2016, the station was used by 7,039 passengers daily (boarding passengers only), and it ranked 25th among the busiest stations of JR Kyushu.

Surrounding area
Tosu Stadium (home to J. League team Sagan Tosu)
Tosu Premium Outlets (15 minutes by bus)
Saga Racetrack (13 minutes by bus)

Bus routes
Nishitetsu Bus Saga
To Tosu city center, Kurume Station (Nishitetsu), Kiyama, Metabara, Kanzaki
To Ogōri Station (Nishitetsu)
To Tosu Premium Outlets

References

External links
Tosu (JR Kyushu)

Railway stations in Saga Prefecture
Nagasaki Main Line
Railway stations in Japan opened in 1889